Collidinium p-toluenesulfonate or CPTS is a salt between p-toluenesulfonic acid and collidine (2,4,6-trimethylpyridine). It is used as a mild glycosylation catalyst in chemistry.

References

Pyridines